Meg Steedle  is an American actress, known for her supporting roles in Boardwalk Empire, Mr. Mercedes and The Mysteries of Laura.

Career 
Steedle had a major supporting role in season 3 of the HBO series Boardwalk Empire, playing Billie Kent.  She has worked extensively in theater, before appearing in the series, in productions including Barefoot in the Park and The Heir Apparent.

Steedle was a recurring character in the first season of NBC's The Mysteries of Laura, portraying Detective Francesca "Frankie" Pulaski.

She appeared in the music video of the Silversun Pickups "Nightlight" on YouTube from their Better Nature LP. She played a mother with a stillborn child in American Horror Story: Coven, in the episode "Burn, Witch. Burn!".

Filmography

Film

Television

References

External links
 

American television actresses
Living people
21st-century American actresses
Actresses from Winston-Salem, North Carolina
American stage actresses
Northwestern University alumni
People from Greensboro, North Carolina
Year of birth missing (living people)